Bachhagel is a municipality in the district of Dillingen in Bavaria in Germany. The current mayor is Ingo Hellstern.

Sons and daughters of the municipality
 Ulrich Graf (1878-1950), national socialist politician, party official and member in SA and SS
 Hubert Schonger (1897-1978), film director and filmproducer.

References

Dillingen (district)